Michael Russell was the defending champion, but lost to Ryan Harrison in the semifinals.
Harrison went on to win the title after defeating Alex Kuznetsov 6–4, 3–6, 6–4 in the final.

Seeds

Draw

Finals

Top half

Bottom half

References
 Main Draw
 Qualifying Draw

Honolulu Challenger - Singles
2011 Singles